Chicago Now Vol. 1 is an album by American jazz saxophonist Ernest Dawkins' New Horizons Ensemble, recorded in 1994 and released on the Swedish Silkheart label.

Reception

In his review for AllMusic, Scott Yanow wrote: "This CD is full of surprises and unpredictable music. Altoist Ernest Dawkins and his versatile sidemen perform a wide variety of originals."

The Penguin Guide to Jazz wrote that this second Silkheart album by the New Horizons "is also patchy, but the addition of Nicholson adds some fire and focus to the overall mix and Dawkins himself seems more contained."

Track listing
All compositions by Ernest Dawkins escept as indicated
 "Improvisations #1" – 6:24
 "The Time Has Come" – 14:37
 "Improvisations #2 (My Baby Blues)" – 3:37
 "Bold Souls" – 7:44
 "Dreams for Rahsaan" (Steve Berry) – 10:20
 "Zera" – 10:53
 "Flowers for the Soul" – 12:20
 "Runnin' from the Rain" – 6:04

Personnel
Ernest Dawkins – alto sax, tenor sax, flute, percussion, vocal
Steve Berry – trombone, percussion
Ameen Muhammad - trumpet, percussion, vocal
Jeff Parker – electric guitar
Yosef Ben Israel – bass
Reggie Nicholson - drums, percussion

References

1995 albums
Ernest Dawkins albums
Silkheart Records albums